Lajos Kovács (born 9 February 1944) is a Hungarian actor. He appeared in more than ninety films since 1978 in addition to the music video for Radiohead's 1997 single "Karma Police".

Selected filmography

References

External links 

1944 births
Living people
Hungarian male film actors